The men's kumite 75 kg competition at the 2019 European Games in Minsk was held on 30 June 2019 at the Čyžoŭka-Arena.

Schedule
All times are local (UTC+3).

Results

Elimination round

Group A

Group B

Finals

References

External links
Draw Sheet

Men's kumite 75 kg